Wang Xiaotang (born 1934) is a Chinese film actress, director and screenplay writer. She is a major general of People's Liberation Army. She won Golden Rooster Award for Best Writing and Hundred Flowers Award for Best Picture for her writing and directing for Fragrant Vows.

Filmography

References

External links

1934 births
Living people
Actresses from Henan
Writers from Kaifeng
Victims of the Cultural Revolution
Chinese film actresses
Film directors from Henan